Åke Edvard Grönhagen (24 January 1885 – 25 December 1974) was a Swedish modern pentathlete and épée fencer who competed in the 1912 Summer Olympics. He finished fourth in the Olympic modern pentathlon, and was eliminated in the first round of the individual épée competition.

Grönhagen's grandson, Carl William "Bill" Gronhagen, was an air traffic controller at Los Angeles International Airport.

References

External links
 profile

1885 births
1974 deaths
Swedish male modern pentathletes
Swedish male épée fencers
Olympic modern pentathletes of Sweden
Olympic fencers of Sweden
Modern pentathletes at the 1912 Summer Olympics
Fencers at the 1912 Summer Olympics
Sportspeople from Stockholm
20th-century Swedish people